The Elder Brother is a 1937 British drama film directed by Frederick Hayward and starring John Stuart, Marjorie Taylor and Basil Langton. It was made at Shepperton Studios as a quota quickie for release by the Hollywood studio Paramount Pictures.

Cast
 John Stuart as Ronald Bellairs 
 Marjorie Taylor as Susan Woodward 
 Basil Langton as Hugo Bellairs 
 Stella Bonheur as Lady Hobbs 
 Hilary Pritchard as Sir Frederick Hobbs 
 Claude Horton as Doctor

References

Bibliography
 Chibnall, Steve. Quota Quickies: The British of the British 'B' Film. British Film Institute, 2007.
 Low, Rachael. Filmmaking in 1930s Britain. George Allen & Unwin, 1985.
 Wood, Linda. British Films, 1927-1939. British Film Institute, 1986.

External links

1937 films
British drama films
British black-and-white films
1937 drama films
Films shot at Shepperton Studios
1930s English-language films
1930s British films